Nephrolepis cordifolia, is a fern native to the global tropics, including northeastern Australia and Asia. It has many common names including fishbone fern, tuberous sword fern, tuber ladder fern, erect sword fern, narrow sword fern and ladder fern, and herringbone fern. It is similar to the related fern Nephrolepis exaltata.

Description

Nephrolepis cordifolia is an evergreen fern that grows to between 40 and 80 centimeters, in extreme cases up to 1 meter. It forms an underground rhizome in the form of several small tubers. The pinnate fronds are erect and pinnate linear to lanceolate, glandular and simple. The rachis bears bicolored chaff scales. The petiole is covered with bicolored pale and dark brown scales.

The leaflets are entire, sessile and elongate-lanceolate. They grow up to 4.8 centimeters long and up to 0.9 cm wide. They stand at a distance of less than 1 centimeter. The sori are rounded. The spores are warty, wrinkled.

Distribution
The species is originally native to north-eastern Australia and the foothills of the Himalayas, and is considered naturalised on the central east coast of New South Wales. They can establish themselves terrestrially, or as an epiphyte or lithophyte, provided that the location has ideal moisture and light levels. In adequate conditions, these ferns grow readily as epiphytes, typically adhering to the bark of tree branches above a water source, where they can receive round-the-clock humidity and airflow. They can be found in a multitude of environments, from deep swamps and riverbanks to rugged outcrops and rock faces, as well as roadsides, ditches, creeks, fallen trees, and even abandoned buildings and ruins. They love moist, shady locations; in their natural range, they are usually found in swamps (as an epiphyte) or along brooks and ditches of coniferous forest floodplains (growing more terrestrially). 

It has been introduced into Bermuda, French Polynesia, New Zealand, and the United States. It is also widely cultivated and distributed by humans, currently found in tropical regions of North, Central and South America (mainly in Mexico, the Caribbean, plus parts of California and Florida), in Africa, Southeast Asia, various South Pacific islands and on the Azores. In the Hawaiian Islands, it is known as kupukupu, okupukupu or ni'ani'au

Invasive species
Nephrolepis cordifolia has become an invasive species is some areas where it has been introduced. In New Zealand it is listed on the National Pest Plant Accord, which prohibits the sale, cultivation and distribution of the plant. It is listed as an invasive species in Florida, United States.

Gallery

References

External links

Nephrolepis cordifolia at the Global Invasive Species Database (Invasive Species Specialist Group)

Nephrolepis cordifolia at Weedbusters (New Zealand)
Nephrolepis cordifolia at the Center for Invasive Species and Ecosystem Health (United States)

cordifolia
Flora of Nepal
Flora of Australia
Garden plants of Australia